Mission Park (alternatively titled Line of Duty) is a 2013 American thriller drama film directed by Bryan Ramirez, starring Jeremy Ray Valdez, Walter Perez, Will Rothhaar, Joseph Julian Soria and Fernanda Romero.

Cast
 Jeremy Ray Valdez as Bobby
 Jeremy Becerra as Young Bobby
 Walter Perez as Jason
 Bryce Cass as Young Jason
 Will Rothhaar as Julian
 Austin Brock as Young Julian
 Joseph Julian Soria as Derek
 Alonzo Lara as Young Derek
 Fernanda Romero as Gina
 Sean Patrick Flanery as The Captain
 Will Estes as The Dealer
 Jesse Borrego as Mr. Ramirez
 Vivica A. Fox as Agent Montelogo
 Douglas Spain as Agent Ortiz
 Julio Cesar Cedillo as Detective Rodriguez
 David Phillips as Detective Brent Jones

Release
The film received a limited theatrical release on 13 September 2013.

Reception
The Hollywood Reporter wrote that the despite the "reasonably effective" performances, the film is "unconvincing from start to finish, with the director relying on so many helicopter shots of the San Antonio skyline that it begins to resemble something that might have been produced by the city’s tourist bureau."

Jeannette Catsoulis of The New York Times wrote that the film is "stuffed with men who think only with their fists, feet and parts in between."

Scott Foundas of Variety wrote that while the film "doesn’t lack ambition", it "lays everything on far too thick", and the performances are "mostly stiff".

Gary Goldstein of the Los Angeles Times wrote that the "talented quartet of young actors can't surmount the wall-to-wall clichés that comprise “Mission Park,” an earnest, not terribly convincing action thriller as generic as its title."

References

External links
 
 

American thriller drama films
2013 thriller drama films